Shane Merritt (born 2000) is an Irish Gaelic footballer who plays at club level with Mallow and at inter-county level with the Cork senior football team. He usually lines out as a centre-back.

Career

Merritt first played competitive Gaelic football with the Mallow club, while also lining out for divisional side Avondhu in various juvenile and underage competitions. He claimed his first silverware at club level when he lined out at centre-back when Mallow beat St. Michael's in the 2021 Cork SAFC final. Merritt first appeared on the inter-county scene when he was selected for the Cork senior football team for the pre-season McGrath Cup competition in 2022. He later earned inclusion on the team's National League panel.

Career statistics

Honours

Mallow
Cork Senior A Football Championship: 2021

References

2000 births
Living people
UCC Gaelic footballers
Mallow Gaelic footballers
Cork inter-county Gaelic footballers
People from Mallow, County Cork